Augustus Bergey Ziegler (October 24, 1875 – April 14, 1960) was an American football player and coach.  He played college football at the University of Pennsylvania, where he was a two-time All-American at guard.  Ziegler served as the head football coach at the University of Delaware from 1929 to 1930, compiling a record of 6–10–2.

Ziegler was born in Royersford, Pennsylvania.  He married Morea Marguerite Drumm on January 20, 1917 in Philadelphia.

Playing career
Ziegler played at the guard position for the University of Pennsylvania from 1903 to 1904 and 1906 to 1907.  He was selected as a consensus first-team All-American in both 1906 and 1907.  In 1907, Ziegler led the Penn Quakers to their fifth national football championship after finishing the season with an 11–1 record.

Head coaching record

College

References

External links

1875 births
1960 deaths
American football guards
California Golden Bears football coaches
Delaware Fightin' Blue Hens football coaches
Penn Quakers football players
Phillips Exeter Academy people
West Virginia Mountaineers football coaches
High school football coaches in New Hampshire
High school football coaches in Pennsylvania
All-American college football players
People from Montgomery County, Pennsylvania